Giulia Lapi (born 5 November 1985) is an Italian synchronized swimmer who competed in the 2008 and 2012 Summer Olympics in the duets event, finishing seventh both times.  In 2008, she competed with Beatrice Adelizzi, and in 2012 with Mariangela Perrupato.

References

External links
 

1985 births
Living people
Italian synchronized swimmers
Olympic synchronized swimmers of Italy
Synchronized swimmers at the 2008 Summer Olympics
Synchronized swimmers at the 2012 Summer Olympics
Artistic swimmers of Fiamme Oro